Edward Miner Gallaudet (February 5, 1837 – September 26, 1917), son of Thomas Hopkins Gallaudet and Sophia Fowler Gallaudet, was the first president of Gallaudet University in Washington, D.C. (then known as the Columbia Institution for the Instruction of the Deaf and Dumb and Blind from 1864 until 1894 and then Gallaudet College from 1894 to 1986) from 1864 to 1910.

Biography
As a youth, he enjoyed working with tools and also built an electrical machine. He kept birds, fowl, and rabbits, spending most of his time in the city, but occasionally venturing into the country.  He had a fond memory of climbing a hill with his father, and another fond memory of his father introducing the subject of geometry to him.  His father died when he was 14, just after he graduated from Hartford High School in Hartford, Connecticut. Gallaudet then went to work at a bank for three years. However, he disliked the "narrowing effect" of the mental monotony of the work, and quit to go to work as a teacher at the school his father founded. He worked there two years, from 1855 to 1857.  While he was teaching, he continued his education at Trinity College in Hartford, completing his studies for a Bachelor of Science degree two years later.

In 1857, Amos Kendall donated  of land for the establishment of a school for the deaf and blind in Washington, D.C., and asked Gallaudet to come to Washington to help lead this school. Edward agreed and became the first principal of the Columbia Institution for the Deaf.

In 1864, Gallaudet sought college status for the Columbia Institution and got it when President Abraham Lincoln signed a bill into law which authorized the Columbia Institution to confer college degrees—a law which was not strictly necessary, but which Gallaudet desired.  This first college of the deaf eventually became Gallaudet University.

Gallaudet was the president of Gallaudet College/Columbia for 46 years (1864–1910), was the head administrator for 53 years (1857–1910), and was the president of the board of directors for 47 years (1864–1911).  He was a staunch advocate of sign language.  He recognized the value of speech training, but also recognized that speech training was not for everyone. Although he initially preferred manualism, stating that sign language was the "natural language of deaf people", throughout his life he came to believe that students should be educated using whichever method fit their specific needs—which could include speech training. He concluded, "no one method is suited to the conditions of all the deaf". Still, he sometimes referred to oralism as the "artificial method" and deemed that it was only a "partial success".

Gallaudet was awarded honorary degrees by Trinity College in 1859 (M.A.) and 1869 (LL.D.), the Columbian University (later George Washington University) also in 1869 (Ph.D.), and Yale University in 1895 (LL.D.).

Gallaudet was a member of the District of Columbia Society of the Sons of the American Revolution and served as the District Society's president from 1897 to 1899.

After retiring as president of Gallaudet College, Gallaudet returned to Hartford.

A statue commemorating Gallaudet's life and works resides on the campus of Gallaudet University, which was sculpted by Pietro Lazzari.

He is buried in Cedar Hill Cemetery in Hartford.

Edson Fessenden Gallaudet, who was Gallaudet's fifth child (and second child with his second wife Susan) was an early pioneer in the field of aviation, being the first to experiment with wing warping, and the founder of the first aircraft factory in America.

Quotations

"The same arguments which go to show that knowledge is power, that the condition of a people is improved in proportion as the masses are educated, have their application with equal weight to the deaf..."—Edward Miner Gallaudet, 1864.

"Deafness, though it be total and congenital, imposes no limits on the intellectual development of its subjects, save in the single direction of the appreciation of acoustic phenomena."—Edward Miner Gallaudet, 1869.

"As eternity is longer than time, as mind is stronger than matter, as thought is swifter than the wind, as genius is more potent than gold, so will the results of well-directed labors toward the development of man's higher faculties ever outweigh a thousand fold any estimate in the currency of commerce, which man can put upon such efforts."—Edward Miner Gallaudet, 1870.

See also
 Gallaudet University
 Bilingual-bicultural education
 Peter Wallace Gallaudet

References

Further reading
Crouch, Barry A. "Gallaudet, Bell & The Sign Language Controversy." Sign Language Studies, vol. 62, 1989, pp. 71–80. JSTOR, doi:10.1353/sls.1989.0008.
Gallaudet, Edward Miner, Gallaudet Inaugural Address, 1864. (Note: The footnote refers to Peet (1850) and Peet (1858))
Gallaudet, Edward Miner, History of the College for the Deaf, 1857—1888, 1888—1906-7. 
Gallaudet, Edward Miner (1983) History of the College for the Deaf, 1857-1907, Washington, DC: Gallaudet College Press.
Gallaudet, Edward Miner, Opening Address at the First Commencement of Gallaudet, 1869. 
Gallaudet, Edward Miner, Address at Dedication of the Main Central Building (now "College Hall"), 1871. 
Gallaudet, Edward Miner, 1879, A Manual of International Law, New York: A.S. Barnes & Co.
Gallaudet, Edward Miner, 1881, "The Milan Convention," in American Annals of the Deaf, Vol. XXVI., No. 1., January 1881, pp. 1–16. 
Gallaudet, Edward Miner, 1881, Remarks on the Combined System, American Annals of the Deaf, Vol. XXVI., No. 1., January 1881, pp. 56–59.
Gallaudet, Edward Miner, 1891, The Combined System of Educating the Deaf, An Address Delivered Upon Invitation Before the Second Congress Held Under the Auspices of the British Deaf And Dumb Association, In the Mission Hall of Glasgow Deaf And Dumb Mission, August 5–7, 1891
Gallaudet, Edward Miner, 1895, "Some Incidents in the Progress of Deaf-Mute Education in America--1890-1895," paper presented at the Fourteenth Convention of the American Instructors of the Deaf at Flint, Michigan. 
Gallaudet, Edward Miner, "What is Speech Worth to the Deaf?" Address given in Paris in 1900. 
Gallaudet, Edward Miner, History of the Columbia Institution for the Deaf, 1911. 
Gallaudet, Edward Miner, Address given on Presentation Day, 1914. 
Boatner, Maxine Tull, 1959, Voice of the deaf; a biography of Edward Miner Gallaudet. Washington, DC: Public Affairs Press.

External links
 Historic film of Edward Miner Gallaudet, 1910
 Articles by Edward Miner Gallaudet in the Silent Worker

1837 births
1917 deaths
19th-century American educators
Burials at Cedar Hill Cemetery (Hartford, Connecticut)
Deaf culture in the United States
Educators from Hartford, Connecticut
Presidents of Gallaudet University
Trinity College (Connecticut) alumni
Educators of the deaf